Yves Leopold Germain Gaston was the patriarch of a large family with roots in the City of Silay, in the province of Negros Occidental, Philippines.

Origin in France
The real and legal surname of Yves Leopold was in fact Germain. He was born in Lisieux, France, the twenty one of the month of Brumaire, Year twelve of the French Republic at six o’clock evening. (November 13, 1803 in Gregorian calendar). Son of Pierre Germain, National Gendarme professional, and Marie Anne Logre married. Later on, he adopted the very French-sounding name of Gaston, certainly because for a Frenchman, the surname Germain created too many problems and confusion. The Name Gaston was retained by the following generations as their surname.

Settlement in Philippines
He settled in the Philippines, where he is credited as the first to commercially produce cane sugar, the primary product of the province.

Gaston first moved to Calatagan, Batangas in 1837 to help Domingo Roxas, a prominent businessman, set up his sugar business. It was there that Gaston met Prudencia Fernandez, who later became his wife. When his partner's business did not prosper, the Frenchman decided to try his prospects first in Iloilo and from there, he ventured to Negros. He arrived  at the port city of Silay in 1840, where he found the soil conducive to planting sugarcane. He brought in an iron mill or "horno economico", which at that time was virtually unheard of.

The iron mill allowed him to begin commercial production of export-quality sugar. The Spaniards endorsed his residence in the Philippines due of the impact of his technology on  the economy. He had become a sugar baron and was exporting the product alongside Nicholas Loney, the first British vice-consul in the country who, because of his efforts to promote sugar, became known as the "Father of the Sugar Industry." Gaston later decided to bring his family to back to France. However, on the way, he fell ill and eventually died. His wife and three children, not knowing a word of French, returned to Silay and permanently settled there, continuing the family business. The sugar industry soon peaked, and sugarcane became the staple crop throughout Negros Occidental.

House of Gaston
The house of Gaston's eldest son is now a museum open to the public and is fondly called the Balay Negrense (Hiligaynon, "The Negrense House").

José Gaston, grandson of Yves Leopold Germain Gaston, built another house called the Hacienda Rosalia in Manapla, Negros Occidental, also open to the public.

References

See also
Silay City
Negros Occidental

French emigrants to the Philippines
People from Lisieux
19th-century Filipino businesspeople
People from Silay